Guemar District is a district of El Oued Province, Algeria. As of the 2008 census, it has a population of 99,592.

Communes 

Bayadha District consists of three communes:
 Guemar
 Ourmes
 Taghzout

References 

Districts of El Oued Province